Tecoma tenuiflora is a species of flowering plants native to Bolivia and Argentina. It is thought to be closely related to T. rosifolia, and hybridizes with T. stans and T. beckii.

References

tenuiflora
Flora of South America